The Carey Treatment is a 1972 American crime thriller film directed by Blake Edwards and starring James Coburn, Jennifer O'Neill, Dan O'Herlihy and Pat Hingle. The film was based on the 1968 novel A Case of Need credited to Jeffery Hudson, a pseudonym for Michael Crichton. Like Darling Lili and Wild Rovers before this, The Carey Treatment was heavily edited without help from Edwards by the studio into a running time of one hour and 41 minutes; these edits were later satirized in his 1981 black comedy S.O.B..

Plot
Dr. Peter Carey (James Coburn) is a pathologist who moves to Boston, where he starts working in a hospital. He soon meets Georgia Hightower (Jennifer O'Neill), with whom he falls in love. Karen Randall (Melissa Torme-March), daughter of the hospital's Chief Doctor, becomes pregnant and is brought to the emergency department after an illegal abortion. She dies there, and Dr. David Tao (James Hong), a brilliant surgeon and friend of Carey, is arrested and accused of being responsible for the illegal abortion. Carey does not believe his friend to be guilty and starts investigating on his own, despite strong opposition by the police and the doctors around the hospital's chief.

Cast
 James Coburn as Dr. Peter Carey
 Jennifer O'Neill as Georgia Hightower
 Pat Hingle as Capt. Pearson
 Skye Aubrey as Nurse Angela Holder
 Elizabeth Allen as Evelyn Randall
 John Fink as Chief Surgeon Andrew Murphy
 Dan O'Herlihy as J.D. Randall
 James Hong as David Tao
 Alex Dreier as Dr. Joshua Randall
 Michael Blodgett as Roger Hudson
 Regis Toomey as Sanderson the Pathologist
 Steve Carlson as Walding
 Rosemary Edelman as Janet Tao
 Jennifer Edwards as Lydia Barrett
 John Hillerman as Jenkins

Production
Film rights were bought in August 1968 by A&M Productions, the production company of Herb Alpert. They said filming would take place the following year in Boston. In October Perry Leff signed Wendell Mayes to a two-picture contract to write and produce, the first of which was to be A Case of Need.

Film rights were then picked up by MGM. In March 1971 it was announced Bill Belasco was producing and Harriet Frank and Irving Ravetch were working on a script. In June Blake Edwards signed to direct.

Filming started in September 1971.

Edwards launched a breach of contract suit against MGM and president James T. Aubrey for their post production tampering of the film. Edwards:
The whole experience was, in terms of filmmaking, extraordinarily destructive. The temper and tantrums from my producer, William Belasco, were such that he insulted me in front of the cast and crew and offered to bet me $1,000 that I'd never work in Hollywood again if I didn't do everything his and Aubrey's way. They told me that they didn't want quality, just a viewable film. The crew felt so bad about the way I was treated that they gave me a party – and usually it's the other way round. I know I've been guilty of excuses but my God what do you have to do to pay your dues? I made Wild Rovers for MGM and kept quiet when they recut it. But this time I couldn't take it. I played fair. They didn't.
Coburn later said "“You know, I don’t mind that film. I liked my work on it. There again the studio (MGM) fucked it up. They cut ten days out of the schedule. They pulled the plug on us early. It’s too bad. We did shoot the film on location in Boston though."

Reception

Critical response
The Carey Treatment received mostly mixed to negative reviews from critics.

On review aggregator Rotten Tomatoes, the film holds an approval rating of 60% based on 5 reviews, with an average score or 5.20/10.

Roger Ebert wrote, "The problem is in the script. There are long, sterile patches of dialog during which nothing at all is communicated. These are no doubt important in order to convey the essential meaninglessness of life, but how can a director make them interesting? Edwards tries." Vincent Canby, writing for The New York Times, was amused by The Carey Treatment but wrote, "...I don't think we have to take this too seriously, for The Carey Treatment, like so many respectable private-eye movies, is sustained almost entirely by irrelevancies."

Accolades
Edgar Allan Poe Awards
 1973: Nominated, 'Best Motion Picture'

See also
 List of American films of 1972

References

External links 
 
 
 
 
 

1972 films
1970s crime thriller films
1970s mystery thriller films
American crime thriller films
American detective films
American mystery thriller films
1970s English-language films
Films about abortion
Films based on American novels
Films based on works by Michael Crichton
Films directed by Blake Edwards
Films scored by Roy Budd
Films set in Boston
Films shot in Boston
Medical-themed films
Metro-Goldwyn-Mayer films
1970s American films